The  Washington Redskins season was the franchise's 57th season in the National Football League (NFL) and their 53rd in Washington, D.C. They failed to improve on their 11–4 record from 1987, when they won Super Bowl XXII, and finished 7-9. The Redskins failed to qualify for the playoffs for the first time since 1985. They were the seventh team in NFL history to enter a season as the defending Super Bowl champion and miss the playoffs.

The Week 8 meeting against Green Bay at Lambeau Field would be the two teams' final meeting for 13 years.

The 7-9 finish would be the only time during Gibbs' first stint with the Redskins that the team finished with a losing record.

Offseason

NFL Draft

Roster

Regular season

Schedule

Note: Intra-division opponents are in bold text.

Game summaries

Week 1

Week 2

Week 14

Standings

1988 Team Starters

Offense

 17 Doug Williams     QB
 32 Craig McEwan      RB
 36 Timmy Smith       FB
 81 Art Monk          WR
 84 Gary Clark        WR
 85 Don Warren        TE

 66 Joe Jacoby        LT
 63 Raleigh McKenzie  LG
 53 Jeff Bostic       C
 73 Mark May          RG
 79 Jim Lachey        RT

Defense

 71 Charles Mann     LDE
 65 Dave Butz        LDT
 77 Darryl Grant     RDT
 72 Dexter Manley    RDT

 51 Monte Coleman    LB
 52 Neal Olkewicz    LB
 58 Wilber Marshall  LB

 45 Barry Wilburn    LCB
 28 Darrell Green    RCB
 40 Alvin Walton     SS
 23 Todd Bowles      FS

 8 Chip Lohmiller    K
 15 Greg Coleman     P
 80 Derrick Shepherd PR
 22 Jamie Morris     KR

Awards and honors
Charles Mann, Pro Bowl selection

References

Washington
Washington Redskins seasons
Wash